The 1882 Canadian federal election was held on June 20, 1882, to elect members  of the House of Commons of Canada of the 5th Parliament of Canada.

Prime Minister Sir John A. Macdonald's Conservatives and Liberal-Conservatives retained power, defeating the Liberal Party of Edward Blake.

National results

Acclamations:

The following Members of Parliament were elected by acclamation;
 British Columbia: 2 Liberal-Conservatives
 Manitoba: 1 Conservative
 Ontario: 2 Conservatives
 Quebec: 11 Conservatives, 1 Independent Conservative, 4 Liberal-Conservatives, 3 Liberals
 New Brunswick: 1 Liberal-Conservative, 1 Independent
 Nova Scotia: 1 Conservative

Results by province

See also
 
List of Canadian federal general elections
5th Canadian Parliament

Notes

References 

1882 elections in Canada
1882
June 1882 events